The 63rd Observation Escadrille was a unit of the Polish Air Force at the beginning of the Second World War. The unit was attached to the Łódź Army.

Air crew
commanding officers:
 kpt. obs. Jan Schram (II - X 1934)
 kpt. pil. Kazimierz Wianecki (X 1934 - V 1935)
 kpt. obs. Jan Haręźlak (X 1937 - IX 1939)

Equipment
7 RWD-14b Czapla airplanes and 2 RWD-8.

See also
Polish Air Force order of battle in 1939

References
 

Polish Air Force escadrilles